Güestia are mythical beliefs in rural Galicia.

Guestia may also refer to:
 Guestia (fungus), a sac fungus genus in family Xylariaceae
 Guestia (moth), a concealer moth genus in subfamily Oecophorinae